Mirza Ali Mousa al-Ihqaqi (October 14, 1887 - January 5, 1967) was a Kuwaiti Twelver Shia marja, and the spiritual leader of the Ihqaqi branch of the Shaykhi school of thought. The al-Ihqaqi family originated from the city of Osku in Iranian Azerbaijan, yet al-Ihqaqi took up residence in Kuwait in the 1950s to lead the Shaykhi community's religious affairs, and he was the first Shaykhi marja who became established in Kuwait.

References

Bibliography 
 
 

Kuwaiti people of Iranian descent
Shaykhis
People from East Azerbaijan Province